Dowery Dell, between Rubery and Halesowen in Worcestershire, was a , nine span lattice steel, single-track railway viaduct that carried the Halesowen to Longbridge railway. A 10 mph speed limit was in operation. The line opened in 1883. Trains ran until 1964 and the viaduct was dismantled in 1965.

Similar structures
The viaduct was remarkable in being a rare example of a lattice girder supported on trestles, a combination of which there may have been only one other example in Britain, at Bennerley Viaduct (extant), though in that instance the trestles are not as high.  

On other well-known trestle-supported viaducts, such as Meldon, Belah, and Crumlin, the superstructure is not a lattice, being typically a Warren truss; and other lattice girders are low structures supported typically on iron caissons, such as Kew Railway Bridge.

Remains
A walk along the footpath that follows the railway route reveals the brick pillar bases that remain in the dell.

References

External links
 Two colour slides of the viaduct and track taken by photographer D J Norton in May 1955 
 Black & white photograph taken from a train crossing the viaduct in November 1963 by ricsrailpics

Geography of Worcestershire
Viaducts in England
Demolished bridges in England
Buildings and structures demolished in 1964
Great Western Railway
Midland Railway